Out to Lunch is the debut studio album of Mainesthai, released in June 1994 by Zoth Ommog Records. It is a side project, along with Benestrophe, of Gary Dassing and Dwayne Dassing of Mentallo & the Fixer with vocalist Michael Greene.

Music
The music of Out to Lunch was entirely composed by Dwayne Dassing and Gary Dassing with Michael Greene writing the lyrics and providing vocals. Like Mentallo & the Fixer's previous albums, Out to Lunch fuses science fiction and horror film samples into its industrial music but with a stronger emphasis on keyboards and unique percussion.

The album was re-released by Metropolis Records on Jananuary 1998 without additional content. On February 16, 2018 it was issued as a music download by Alfa Matrix on the label's Bandcamp

Reception

Steve Huey of AllMusic awarded the album three out of five stars and said "Mainesthai's Out to Lunch features aggressive industrial rhythms underpinning the melodic vocals of Mike Greene." Lollipop Magazine commended the band for emphasizing melody but criticized the overall execution of the album. Sonic Boom but was critical of the vocal performances, saying "Mr. Greene has chosen to utilize very stereotypical effects processing which is very uninspiring and ultimately boring." The critic recommended the album to admirers of Mentallo & The Fixer despite noting that the music sounded dated at the time of their review.

Track listing

Personnel
Adapted from the Out to Lunch liner notes.

Mainesthai
 Dwayne Dassing (as The Fixer) – programming, cover art, illustrations, producer
 Gary Dassing (as Mentallo) – programming, guitar, cover art, illustrations, producer
 Michael Greene – vocals, producer

Release history

References

External links 
 
 Out to Lunch at Bandcamp
 Out to Lunch at iTunes

1994 debut albums
Mainesthai albums
Alfa Matrix albums
Metropolis Records albums
Zoth Ommog Records albums